Monadofilosa is a grouping of Cercozoa. (It is sometimes considered one of three, the other two being Phytomyxa and Reticulofilosa.) These organisms are single-celled amoeboid protists.

Classification
Monadofilosa includes the testaceans, which are testate filose amoeboids, and the cercomonads.

It is sometimes described as Testaceafilosia and Sarcomonadea.

It has also been described as Sarcomonadea (Cercomonas, Heteromita, Bodomorpha, Proleptomonas, Allantion), Thecofilosea (Cryptodifflugia, Cryothecomonas), Spongomonadea (Spongomonas, Rhipidodendron), and Imbricatea (Thaumatomonas, Thaumatomastix, Allas, Gyromitus, Euglypha, Trinema, Paulinella).

 The testaceans live both in marine and freshwater habitats, and in mosses.  Members include Lecythium, Pseudodifflugia, Euglypha (a euglyphid), and Paulinella chromatophora.
 Cercomonads are flagellates that glide on their posterior cilium and/or generate filopodia.  Members of this group contain Cryothecomonas, Thaumatomonas, which is covered with siliceous scales, and Cercomonas, which is naked.  Cercomonas contains several species that show exhibit amoeboid movement, such as the testate amoeba Cyphoderia, and the flagellate Cryothecomonas.

Monadofilosa is sometimes treated as a superclass rather than a subphylum.

Sainouron has been grouped in Monadofilosa.

Phylogeny
Phylogeny based on Bass et al. 2009, Howe et al. 2011 and Bass et al. 2016.

Taxonomy
 Infraphylum Monadofilosa Cavalier-Smith 1997 stat. n. Cavalier-Smith & Oates 2012 [Eoglissa Cavalier-Smiths 2012]
 Family ?Katabiidae Cavalier-Smith 2012
 Order ?Pseudodimorphida
 Order Cercomonadida Poche 1913 emend. Karpov et al. 2006
 Class Helkesea Cavalier-Smith 2017
 Order Ventricleftida Cavalier-Smith 2011
 Order Helkesida Cavalier-Smith 2017 [Sainourida]
 Class Metromonadea Cavalier-Smith 2007
 Order Metromonadida Bass & Cavalier-Smith 2004 emend. Cavalier-Smith & Oates 2012
 Order Metopiida Cavalier-Smith 2003
 Clade Glissomonadida-Pansomonadida
 Order Pseudosporida Hibberd 1983 sensu Cavalier-Smith 1993
 Order Dimorphida Siemensma 1991 [Endonucleoplastiales]
 Order Glissomonadida Howe & Cavalier-Smith 2009 emend. Hess et al. 2013
 Order Pansomonadida Vickerman 2005
 Superclass Ventrifilosa Cavalier-Smith 2012
 Class Thecofilosea Cavalier-Smith 2003 emend. Cavalier-Smith 2011 [Tripylea Hertwig 1879]
 Order ?Hemimastigida Foissner, Blatterer & Foissner 1988
 Subclass Eothecia Cavalier-Smith 2012
 Family ?Botuliformidae
 Order Matazida Cavalier-Smith 2012
 Order Ebriida Poche [Ebriales Honigsberg 1964; Stereotestales]
 Order Cryomonadida Cavalier-Smith 1993 [Cryothecomonadida]
 Subclass Tectosia Cavalier-Smith 2012
 Order Tectofilosida Cavalier-Smith & Chao 2003
 Infraclass Phaeodaria Haeckel 1879 stat. n. Cavalier-Smith & Chao 2012
 Order Eodarida Cavalier-Smith 2012
 Order Opaloconchida Cavalier-Smith 2012
 Class Silicofilosea Adl et al. 2005 emend. Adl et al. 2012 [Imbricatea Cavalier-Smith 2011]
 Subclass Placoperla Cavalier-Smith 2012
 Superorder Perlatia Cavalier-Smith 2012
 Order Perlofilida Cavalier-Smith 2012
 Order Spongomonadida Hibberd 1983 emend. Karpov 1990
 Superorder Placofila Cavalier-Smith 2012
 Order Zoelucasida Cavalier-Smith 2014
 Order Rotosphaerida Rainer 1968
 Order Thaumatomonadida Shirkina 1987
 Subclass Placonuda Cavalier-Smith 2012
 Order ?Discocelida Cavalier-Smith 1997
 Order ?Discomonadida Cavalier-Smith 2014
 Superorder Euglyphia Cavalier-Smith 2012
 Order Euglyphida Copeland 1956 emend. Cavalier-Smith 1997 [Euglyphina Bovee 1985]
 Superorder Nudisarca Cavalier-Smith 2012
 Order Variglissida Cavalier-Smith 2014 [Clautriaviida; Nudifilida]
 Order Marimonadida Cavalier-Smith & Bass 2011 [Auranticordida]

References

External links

Filosa
Superclasses (biology)